AS Douanes is a Mauritanian professional football club based in the capital Nouakchott that currently competes in the Mauritanian Premier League.

History
The club was promoted to the Mauritanian Premier League following the 2020–2021 second division season.

References

External links
Soccerway profile

Douanes